The International Museum of the Baroque (Museo Internacional del Barroco in Spanish) is a museum of Baroque art designed by Japanese architect Toyo Itō located in Puebla, Mexico. It opened on February 4, 2016.

Gallery

See also 
 Amparo Museum

References 

Art museums and galleries in Mexico
Baroque
Deconstructivism
Museums in Puebla
Puebla (city)